In Norse mythology, Valaskjálf ("the Shelf of the Slain") is one of Odin's Halls, a great dwelling built and roofed with pure silver. In this room is a high seat, Hliðskjálf, where Odin can watch over the entire universe.

See also
 Valhalla, another of Odin's halls, to where half of those who were killed in battle go.

References

Locations in Norse mythology
Odin